The Dred and Ellen Yelverton House is a historic home located near Fremont, Wayne County, North Carolina.  It was designed by architect George Franklin Barber, is one of the most intact Barber houses in North Carolina.  It was built about 1913, and is a two-story, weatherboarded frame dwelling with elements of Queen Anne and Colonial Revival style architecture.  It has a steep deck-on-hip slate roof, one-story rear ell, and one- and two-story wraparound verandah.  Also on the property is a contributing Carbide House (c. 1913).

The building was listed on the U.S. National Register of Historic Places in 2009.

References

Houses on the National Register of Historic Places in North Carolina
Queen Anne architecture in North Carolina
Colonial Revival architecture in North Carolina
Houses completed in 1913
Houses in Wayne County, North Carolina
National Register of Historic Places in Wayne County, North Carolina
1913 establishments in North Carolina